This List of cases involving Abraham Lincoln concerns litigation while Abraham Lincoln worked as a lawyer. He brought cases to local courts, the Illinois Supreme Court and the United States Supreme Court during his career before he became President of the United States.

Illinois Supreme Court
Abraham Lincoln was counsel of record in approximately 175 cases before Illinois' highest court.  The history website of the Illinois Supreme Court lists all of these cases that have official citations, beginning with, Scammin vs Wine, 3 Ill. 456 (1840), through to, State of Illinois v. Illinois Central Railroad Company, 27 Ill. 64 (1861).

People ex rel. Stevenson v Higgins, 15 Ill 110 (1853) concerning trustees of a hospital. Lincoln acted for Higgins. He lost on the point of who, precisely, was empowered by common law to exercise the right of removal. Lincoln argued that it should only be the legislature, the governor or the Supreme Court, but not the hospital’s trustees, but the court felt the trustees too could exercise the power of amotion. 
Sprague v. Illinois River Railroad Co. 19 Ill 174 (1857) effect of amendment to railroad company's charter on liability of stockholders.

US Supreme Court
Lewis v Lewis 48 US 776 (1849) on construction of an Illinois Statute of Limitations
Williamson v Barrett 54 US 101 (1851) steamboat damages

Notes

See also
United States labor law
United States corporate law
United States tort law

References
Lincoln Financial Foundation Collection, Abraham Lincoln's important cases (1959) 
Brian McGinty, Lincoln's Greatest Case: The River, the Bridge, and the Making of America (2015)

External links
Lincoln’s Cases Before the Illinois Supreme Court
Lincoln day by day chronology

Abraham Lincoln
Legal history of Illinois